Talysh Khanate or Talish Khanate was a khanate of Iranian origin that was established in Persia and existed from the middle of the 18th century till the beginning of the 19th century, located in the south-west coast of the Caspian Sea.

It comprised the southeastern part of the modern-day Republic of Azerbaijan and the eastern tip of north-western Iran. The capital of the khanate was its chief city, Lenkaran. As a result of the Persian defeat in the Russo-Persian War of 1826–28, the khanate was dissolved and absorbed by the Russian Empire.

The uncertainty surrounding the history of Talysh Khanate is not due only to the paucity of sources, a further problem is the rarity of studies about it. Several studies and short surveys appeared in Russian, Azerbaijani, Turkish, and Persian. Regrettably, some of these studies are tenuous and contain erroneous and biased interpretations.

Historiography 
Because of the paucity of primary sources, the study of the Talysh Khanate faces serious obstacles. The primary sources for the study of the Khanate are roughly divided into three groups: chronicles, documentary material, and travel accounts. Many facts related to the history of the Khanate are scattered throughout various chronicles produced by local and Qajar historians.

The first Persian chronicle about the Talysh Khanate is Javāher Nāmeh-ye Lankarān (1869) (i.e., The Jewel Book of Lankaran), written by Saeid-Ali ibn Kazem Beg Borādigāhi (1800–1872). There are two copies of The Jewel Book of Lankaran, and both are retained at the Institute of Manuscripts of Azerbaijan. The second Persian chronicle is Akhbār Nāmeh (1882) (i.e., The Chronicle), written by Mirza Ahmad ibn Mirza Khodāverdi, whose father served as the vizier for the second and the third Khans of Talysh.

Another primary source that may be added to the chronicle-type sources is the Russian survey entitled The History of the Talysh Khanate (1885) written by Teymur Bayramalibeyov (1863–1937), one of the most brilliant Azerbaijani educators.

A nonspecific but relevant chronicle which written in Persian is Gulistān-i Iram (1845) (i.e., The Heavenly Rose-Garden) from Abbas-Qoli Aqa Bakikhanov (1794–1847). Although not dealing directly with the Talysh Khanate, it contains useful information on the region up to the year in which it was completed.

The major body of correspondence of the Khans of Talysh is preserved in Russian archives and has been published in various collections of documents. The most important of these collections is the Acts collected by the Caucasian Archaeographic Commission (1866–1886).

Travelogues and reports by merchants, agents, and informers, are another type of primary source that is potentially useful for the study of the Talysh Khanate. Among this type of source, one may mention accounts written by two Poles in Russian service: Jan Potocki (1761–1815), and Aleksander Chodźko (1804–1891). Another account relating to Talysh, is a report made by Camille Alphonse Trézel (1780–1860), a French officer who served under Claude-Matthieu Gardane (1766–1818), Napoleon's envoy to the Persian court.

In 1966, Firudin Asadov (1936–2018), who first studied the pre-establishment of Talysh Khanate, gave a brief description of the roots of the establishment of the Khanate in 1703–1747 period. Irada Mammadova (born 1967), an academician of the Azerbaijan National Academy of Sciences, studied Russian archives especially the Archive of Foreign Policy of the Russian Empire and published several books and articles.

Background 
In Safavid era, the population of Safavid Talish was a mixture of Iranian and Turkic elements. Generally, the Talyshis, an ethnic group speaking the Iranian language of Talysh, were Indigenous people of the region. At the end of the 15th century, many Talysh leaders provided solid support to the Safavids, who rewarded them with honours and land. Theoretically, the local rulers were not hereditary lords.

Seyyed Abbas was the founder of the dynasty of Khans of Talysh. He had had a kinship with the Safavid dynasty. The genealogy of Seyyed Abbas goes back to the Prophet Muhammad. His father was from the former Hir village of Khalkhal district. According to Saeid-Ali's book, Seyyed Abbas appointed on Rabi' al-Thani 1064 AH (February 1654) as khalifa (i.e., spiritual deputy) of the Lankaran by the decree of Shah Abbas II. There are conflicting and inaccurate opinions between The Jewel Book of Lankaran and The Chronicle, about the years of Seyyed Abbas' rule and when the future Talysh Khanate was founded.

According to The Chronicle, Seyyed Abbas ruled the Talysh province for 20 years, consisting of Ulūf, Dashtevand, and Ujarud districts. Asadov wrote in his book, Talysh Khanate (1998), that Seyyed Mir Abbas Beg not only supports Nader's kingship but even asked to be accepted his son, Jamal al-Din, to serve in the Persian army. Also, he wrote that Seyyed Abbas' rule of the Talysh Khanate did not last long, he died in 1749. He attributed the coming to power of the Seyyed Abbas in Lankaran, after the proclamation of Nader Afshar as Shah. The Turkish academic, Mustafa Aydın (born 1967), also wrote the above narrative in the İslâm Ansiklopedisi.

Mammadova didn't think that Seyyed Abbas could have lived that long. If Seyyed Abbas died in 1749 (according to The Chronicle, his reign lasted 20 years), then he should have come to power in 1729. At that time, Nader was not the Shah of Persia. On the other hand, Russian archival documents show that Mir Abbas Beg was captured and beheaded by the Ottomans during the 1726 invasion. Asadov wrote that Nader Shah ordered Seyyed Abbas to come to power in Talysh. However, he does not say where he got it from. This would not be possible. Because, first of all, the archival documents say that he had killed. The second is that in Saeid-Ali's book when Nader proclaimed himself as Shah, he wrote that Mir Abbas was no longer alive.

The decree for Seyyed Abbas was issued in 1654 and seems that Asadov confused the "Seyyed Abbas" with the "Mir Abbas". Seyyed Abbas could not attend the Mughan kurultai or die in 1747. The Chronicle stated that Seyyed Abbas had only one sister. However, Saeid-Ali wrote that Qara Khan took control of Talysh in a short time and always tried to extinguish it when enmity broke out between his cousins and his sons. Thus, they were brothers of Mir Abbas, not Seyyed Abbas.

The contradictions between The Chronicle and The Jewel Book of Lankaran are obvious and far from reality. Mammadova believed that it would be right to prefer Saeid-Ali, because he approached the events from Mirza Ahmad's historical point of view, used the historical sources of his time and in some cases expressed a critical attitude. The author indicates the exact date of the 1654 decree, thus it can be assumed that he saw the decree. The Chronicle attributed this event to the period of Nader's rule and described that he turned from a poor man to the level of Lankaran's ruler. According to Mammadova, This is not convincing because it is incompatible with historical events. Seyyed Abbas is not mentioned in the works of Russian and foreign travellers who visited these areas, only Musa Khan of Astara is mentioned a lot.

It should be concluded that there were two people with the name of "Abbas". The first was Seyyed Abbas, who founded the dynasty of Khans of Lankaran. The second was Mir Abbas or Abbas-Qoli Khan, who became a Khan in the early 18th century and was killed by the Ottomans in 1726. This is confirmed by other facts. An archival document mentions Mir Aziz Khan as the brother of Mir Abbas Beg. Elsewhere, Mir Abbas Beg offers to entrust either his brother or his son to Russia to show his allegiance. Mammadova named Mir Abbas as the son of Seyyed Abbas, but Khansuvarov believed that Mir Abbas was the grandson of Seyyed Abbas. His father's name was Seyyed Yūsef, who succeeded his grandfather in religious affairs. Seyyed Yūsef was buried at Yuxarı Nüvədi village of Lankaran.

Mir Abbas married the sister of Asad beg ibn Hossein beg Boradigāhi, beg of Kharkhatān village, and from this marriage, Jamal al-Din was born. Jamal al-Din's father died when he was 18 years old (Mir Abbas was killed by the Ottomans in 1726) and his maternal uncle Asad Beg took care of him.

Administration 
The Talysh region comprised lands in the southwestern part of the current Republic of Azerbaijan, as well as some territories in modern Iran. The exact definition of Talysh boundaries has varied over time. Present-day, Talysh is a mountainous region located between Gilan Province and the Caspian Sea in the east and Ardabil Province in the west. It is a narrow strip of land extending from Rudbar in the south to Astara in Iranian territory and on to the north of Lankaran District, located in the Republic of Azerbaijan. The northern half of Talysh is one of the seventeen provinces that were cut from Iranian territory as a result of the treaties of Gulistan (1813) and Turkmenchay (1828).

The Talysh Khanate was bordered by the Gilan Khanate from the south, Ardabil Khanate from the southwest, Karadagh Khanate in the northwest, Javad Khanate from the north, and Salyan Sultanate from the north-east. Most of the eastern borders of the Khanate were bound to the Caspian Sea.

Talysh Khanate was divided into administrative districts. According to the Saeid-Ali's book, there were eleven districts in the territory of the Khanate: Asalem, Karganrud, Astara, Vilkij, Zuvand, Chayichi-Lankaran, Drigh, Uluf, Dashtevand, Sefiddasht, Ujarud.

However, the territory of the Khanate did not always remain stable but underwent significant changes under the influence of various events.

The largest territorial transformation in the Khanate took place during the Russo-Persian Wars. According to the treaties concluded between these states, all of Asalem, Karganrud and Vilkij districts and some parts of the Ujarud, Safidasht, Astara and Zuvand districts were given to Qajar Iran.

The administration institutions of the Khanate was not that big. Management was generally given to begs and devout landlords. The begs always worked in the whole of the Khanate and the Khan's saray. The closest assistant to the Khan was the Chief Vizier. Apart from this, the sarkar-i ali was responsible in the financial affairs, and the eshik-aqasi was responsible in the business affairs. Taxes were collected by lieutenants, Kadkhodās (village chief) and Yuzbashis. The sandouqdar-aqası (Treasurer) supervised their affairs.

At the head of the districts were the lieutenants and the begs. They were to deal with taxes, organize local finance affairs, and solve minor problems. The landlords were responsible to the lieutenants and were led by the begs. They were chosen by the rural community and were confirmed by the Khan. None of them was inherited, but if the Khan agreed, it could be hereditary. Cities were run by tax officials and castellans. They had to protect the city from external influences and maintain internal security. Cities were divided into separate neighbourhoods. The defence of borders and strategic locations were given to landlords whose estates were in the frontier and on trade routes.

History 

According to Mirza Ahmad Mirza oglu Khudaverdi, the founder of the Talysh Khanate, Seyyid Abbas, his ancestors were members of the Safavid dynasty, who had moved into the Talish region during the 1720s during a turbulent period in Iranian history. When Seyyid Abbas died in 1747 he was succeeded by his son Jamaladdin, often remembered as Gara Khan (the 'Black King'), because of his dark skin. Because of his good service to Nader Shah, Nader officially awarded him the hereditary title of khan. Gara Khan was pro-Russian in his foreign policy which upset the rulers of neighbouring khanates notably Hidayat Khan of Gilan. In 1768 Hidayat Khan attacked the Talysh khanate. Seeking aid against the superior enemy, Gara Khan sent his brother Karbalayi Sultan to Fath Ali Khan, ruler of the Quba Khanate resulting in an alliance between Quba and Lankaran. By 1785 the territory of the Talysh khanate had formally become a dependency of that much stronger Quba Khanate together with certain other Azerbaijani khanates. However, in 1789 following Fath Ali Khan's death, the Talysh Khanate regained its independence under Mir Mustafa, the son of Gara Khan who had himself died in 1786.

In 1794-5 the Persian Shah Agha Muhammad Khan Qajar called on the various khanates of the South Caucasus to form an alliance against the Russian Empire and mounted a military expedition against those who refused to join him. The Talysh khanate refused to do and was attacked in 1795. Mir Mustafa Khan's disparate army was not strong enough to resist and he sent his representatives to General Gudovich asking for Russian protection. However, the Russians took a long time to respond, only finally arriving in 1802 when the Talysh Khanate became a protectorate of the Russian Empire.

The khanate was to remain a pawn between the Persian and Russian empires over the subsequent two decades. In 1809 as a part of the Russo-Persian War (1804-1813), Iranian troops took the city of Lenkaran and expelled the Russian-leaning khan. In 1812, with Napoleon was attacking Moscow, the Russians were also battling again in the Caucasus. After a brief siege led by Pyotr Kotlyarevsky on January 1, 1813, 2,000 Russian troops managed to decisively take the citadel of Lenkaran from the Persian army. There were heavy losses on both sides, but this strategic capture of Lankaran led inexorably to September 12, 1813 Treaty of Gulistan. This forced defeated Persia to cede many of the formerly independent khanates to Russia. In 1814 Mir Mustafa khan died and his son Mir Hassan Khan succeeded him but only in name.

With Russia busy in European wars, Persia attempted to reassert its hegemony in the area and to revert the Treaty of Gulistan and thus invaded the south Caucasus, starting the 1826-28 Russo-Persian war. In the campaign of 1826, Persia managed to regain all lost territories, but after the numerous defeats in the campaign of 1827, the war ended up with the even more humiliating Treaty of Turkmenchay which permanently ceded the Talysh Khanate to Russia.

Yermolov took over the khanates of eastern Transcaucasia one by one and deposed their khans: Shaki in 1819, Shirvan in 1820, and Qara-Bagh in 1822. Only Mir Hassan Khan of Talesh was allowed autonomy, Ermolov understanding him and his family to be implacably hostile to Iran. In fact, Mir Hassan threw the Russians out in the year that hostilities reopened, and a strong Iranian force came to help him. He retained control of the khanate, in the name of the Shah, until he was forced to abandon it in 1828 by the Treaty of Turkmenchay.

After Mir Hasan Khan's death, his children came under Abbas Mirza's patronage, with Mir Kazem Khan becoming the governor of Vilkij, Astara, Ujarud, and Namin, forming the Namin Khanate. His rule, and that of his children, over those areas, lasted a century, ending with the fall of the Qajars.

In popular culture 
The Talysh Khans proved a stimulating subject for famed Azeri poet-playwright Mirza Fath-Ali Akhundzadeh (1812–1878). A 1938 production of his The Adventures of the Vizier of the Lankaran's Khan (1851), starred the future president of Republic of Azerbaijan, Heydar Aliyev, then just a teenager.

Rulers

Footnotes

Notes

References

Sources

Further reading 

 
 
 
 
 
 

 
18th century in Azerbaijan
Khanates of the South Caucasus
Iranian dynasties